This is a list of the Dutch Top 40 number-one singles of 2006. The Dutch Top 40 is a chart that ranks the best-performing singles of the Netherlands. It is published by radio station Radio 538.

Chart history

Number-one artists

See also

 2006 in music
 List of number-one hits (Netherlands)

References

2006 in the Netherlands
Netherlands
2006